Aspilia mossambicensis, also known as wild sunflower, is a medicinally useful herbaceous plant of the family Compositae (Asteraceae). It is widespread with an anthropogenic distribution in central and Eastern tropical Africa from Ethiopia, through East Africa, the Congo, Zambia, Zimbabwe, Malawi, Mozambique and South Africa. 

A. mossambicensis is used by herbalists and local people to treat such ailments and conditions as malaria, bacterial infection and human immunodeficiency virus (HIV). It is also used to reduce menstrual cramps as well as a uterotonic able to induce uterine contraction and labour in confinements. This species is used together with the Neem tree to control the breeding cycles of Nile tilapia, Oreochromis niloticus. Drugs extracted from the two species inhibit early maturing and reproduction of the fish, countering problems raised by having populations of diverse ages in commercial breeding ponds.

Phytochemical and anti-microbial properties
Two powerful stimulators of uterine contraction, the diterpenes kaurenoic and grandiflorenic acids, were found in the leaves of Aspilia mossambicensis. This lends credence to the idea that wild chimpanzees consume leaves of Aspilia species because of their pharmacological properties and could shed light on female chimpanzees' consuming such leaves more frequently than do males. Substantial amounts of thiarubrines, antifungal and nematocidal dithianes, were found in roots of plants growing throughout chimpanzee habitats.

References

Heliantheae
Taxa named by Daniel Oliver
Taxa named by Hiram Wild